Ernardo "Harry" Andrés Gómez Cañas (born July 30, 1982 in Bolívar) is a Venezuelan former professional volleyball player, who won the gold medal with the Venezuela national team at the 2003 Pan American Games in Santo Domingo, Dominican Republic.

He is 195 cm and 100 kg weight. He played over 300 times for his national team. He also played for Fenerbahçe Istanbul in Turkey, Ulbra in Brazil, Olympiacos Piraeus, Panathinaikos VC and PAOK Thessaloniki, in Greece and Toyoda Gosei Trefuerza in Japan.

At only 20 years of age Harry, as he is affectionately known‚ was Venezuela's main attacking weapon. A powerful attack near the net as well as from the back zone and an excellent service were his strongest weapons and since making his international debut at the age of 13 he proved to be Venezuela's ace card.

Standing at only 195 cm tall‚ Gomez has never come up short on court. He was the best scorer of the Intercontinental Rounds of the 2001 World League and has picked up a silver medal at the FIVB Youth World Championship in Saudi Arabia in 1999‚ a bronze medal at the Junior FIVB WCH in Poland in 2001‚ and two fourth places in Bahrain 1997 and Thailand 1999.

He won with his team the gold medal at the 2005 Bolivarian Games.

He was part of the Venezuela men's national volleyball team at the 2014 FIVB Volleyball Men's World Championship in Poland. He played for Toyoda Gosei Trefuerza.

Sporting achievements

Club

National Championships

 2000/2001  Greek Championship with Olympiacos
 2002/2003  Greek Championship with Olympiacos
 2005/2006  Greek Championship with Panathinaikos
 2007/2008  Turkish Championship with Fenerbahçe
 2014/2015  Greek Championship with PAOK
 2016/2017  Greek Championship with PAOK

National Cups

 2000/2001  Greek Cup, with Olympiacos
 2007/2008  Turkish Cup, with Fenerbahce
 2014/2015  Greek Cup, with PAOK

National Super Cups
 2000  Greek Super Cup, with Olympiacos
 2006  Greek Super Cup, with Panathinaikos

Individually
 2001–02 CEV Champions League Top Scorer'''
 2003–04 Greek Championship MVP 2005–06 Greek Championship MVP 2007–08 Turkish Championship MVP 2007–08 Turkish Championship Top scorer2009–10 Japanese Championship Top scorer2014–15 Greek Championship MVP''

Awards
 YOUNG WORLD CHAMPIONSHIP SAUDI ARABIA MVP 1999
 JUNIOR WORLD CHAMPIONSHIP POLAND MVP 2001
 World League 2001 Best Scorer of International Round
 Pan Americans Games Santo Domingo 2003 Gold Medal and MVP
 Olympics Games Beijing 2008 China 9 Places and Best Scorer of Qualifications Round
 Fenerbahce 2007-08 Doble title Cup and League champions (Best Scorer and MVP)
 3 TIME MVP OF GREEK LEAGUE 2001, 2006, 2015
 Toyoda Gosei 2004-05 7 Places and Best Scorer with the Record in the League with 711 points in 28 Games,
 JT Thunders 2008 6 Places and Best Scorer
 JT Thunders 2009 5 Places and Silver medal in the Emperator Cup and MVP
 JT Thunders 2010 5 Places and Best Scorer and Best Server
 JT Thunders 2011 6 Places

National Team

 Young World Championship Silver Medal and MVP
 Junior World Championship Bronze Medal and MVP

Senior Team

 American Cup Argentina 1998 6 Places
 American Cup USA 1999 6 Places
 American Cup Brazil 2000 5 Places

Pan American Games Winnipeg 1999 Canada 4 Place

World League 2001 Best scorer of International Round 2002, 2003, 2007, 2008
World Championship Argentina 2002
Pan Americans Games Santo Domingo 2003 Gold Medal and MVP
 2005 Bolivarian Games, -  Gold Medal 
World Championship Japan 2006 
Pan American Games Rio Brazil 2007 4 Places 
Sud American Championship Rio Brasil 2007
World Cup Japan 2007
Olympics Games Beijing 2008 China 9 Places and Best Scorer of Qualifications Round 
Center American and Caribbeans Games Mayagues Puerto Rico 2010 Silver Medal 
World Championship Poland 2014

Brazilian League 
Ulbra 2000 4 places

lleyLeague

 ).

Turkish League 
Fenerbahce 2007-08 Doble Title Cup and League Champions, Best Scorer and MVP
Ziraat Bank 2012 9 Places
Inegol Belediye Sport Club 2015-16

Japanese V-League 
Toyoda Gosei 2004-05 7 Places and Best scorer with the record in the league with 711 Points in 28 Games.
JT Thunders 2008 6 Places and Best Scorer, 2009 5 Places and Silver Medal in the Emperator cup, 2010 5 Places and Best Scorer and Best Server, 2011 6 Places

References

External links
 FIVB Profile
 PAOK Team Roster

1982 births
Living people
Venezuelan men's volleyball players
Olympiacos S.C. players
Panathinaikos V.C. players
Fenerbahçe volleyballers
PAOK V.C. players
Olympic volleyball players of Venezuela
Volleyball players at the 2003 Pan American Games
Volleyball players at the 2007 Pan American Games
Volleyball players at the 2008 Summer Olympics
Sportspeople from Caracas
Pan American Games gold medalists for Venezuela
Pan American Games medalists in volleyball
Medalists at the 2003 Pan American Games
20th-century Venezuelan people
21st-century Venezuelan people